Arthur Harper may refer to:

 Arthur Cyprian Harper (1866–1948), mayor of Los Angeles, California, 1906–1909
 Arthur Paul Harper (1865–1955), New Zealand lawyer, mountaineer, explorer, businessman and conservationist
 Arthur Harper (trader) (1835–1897), immigrant to the U.S. from northern Ireland, trader and miner in Alaska, British Columbia and California, in Alaska Mining Hall of Fame
 Arthur H. Harper (1955–2017), American businessman
 Arthur Harper (musician) (1939–2004), jazz musician